Daniel Liew Yao Xiang (Liew Yao Xiang, born 1 May 1981) is a former Singaporean swimmer, who specialized in breaststroke events. During his sporting career, Liew held a Singaporean record in the medley relay (3:51.16) from the 2001 Southeast Asian Games, and later represented Singapore at the 2000 Summer Olympics. He also played for the Chinese Swimming Club before entering the national team.

Liew competed only in the men's 100 m breaststroke at the 2000 Summer Olympics in Sydney. After winning a silver medal from the Southeast Asian Games in Brunei a year earlier, his entry time of 1:04.95 was officially accredited under a FINA B-standard. He challenged seven other swimmers in heat four, including two-time Olympians Valērijs Kalmikovs of Latvia and Arsenio López of Puerto Rico. Coming from second on the initial length, he faded down the stretch with a poor swim to a seventh seed in 1:06.41, almost 1.5 seconds below his entry standard. Liew failed to advance into the semifinals, as he placed fifty-seventh overall on the first day of prelims.

References

External links
 
 
 

1981 births
Living people
Singaporean male breaststroke swimmers
Olympic swimmers of Singapore
Swimmers at the 2000 Summer Olympics
Southeast Asian Games medalists in swimming
Southeast Asian Games silver medalists for Singapore
Competitors at the 1999 Southeast Asian Games